Momčilo "Moma" Rajin (born 23 February 1954 in Bela Crkva) is a Serbian art and music critic, theorist and historian, artist, publisher and cultural facilitator, living and working in Belgrade.

Biography

He graduated in 1978. at the Faculty of Philosophy in Belgrade, Department of History of Art, on the theme "Rock Graphics".

Being notable critic and theorist of culture and arts, he was also editor and/or publisher of important Yugoslav pop-culture magazines and journals: Džuboks and Ritam (pop-rock music), YU strip (comics) and Moment (contemporary arts), etc.

He is considered as one of the key people of new wave music in Yugoslavia, promoting and influencing bands like "Idoli", "Električni orgazam" and "Šarlo Akrobata", as well as of Serbian/Yugoslav comics, supporting early careers of Zoran Janjetov, Rajko Milošević - Gera, Zoran Tucić, Dejan Nenadov or Darko Perović.

He was member of art group "Aux Maniere" with Slobodan Šajin (1982-1986).

Bibliography
 Momčilo Rajin. Post Pop 1 - Tekstovi 2002-2004, "Draslar", Beograd, 2006, 
 Momčilo Rajin. Post Pop 2 - Tekstovi 2004-2006, "Draslar", Beograd, 2006,

References

External links
 Lidija Merenik. Selektivna hronologija: nove pojave u slikarstvu i skulpturi u Srbiji 1979-1989 " in: The art at the end of century (Umetnost na kraju veka), "Clio", Belgrade, 1998. E-book: Project Rastko, 2001. (Serbian)
 Audio interview with Momčilo Rajin, "Deca Apokalipse 20" show, Radio Svetigora, Cetinje, Montenegro, 2008. (Serbian)
 "Možda sad i nikad više: Momčilo Rajin i Dragan Ambrozić - 20 godina Ritma", an interview by Nebojša Marić, "Popoboks" webzine, Belgrade, March 20, 2009. (Serbian)
 "Dvadeset godina Paket aranžmana", Vreme, Belgrade, no. 539, May 3, 2001. (Serbian)

Serbian art critics
Serbian music critics
Comics critics
European art curators
Serbian art historians
Serbian artists
Serbian publishers (people)
Living people
Cultural historians
Mass media theorists
Yugoslav music people
Serbian comics artists
1954 births
People from Bela Crkva